Tolypella is a genus of green algae belonging to the family Characeae.

The genus was described in 1857 by Alexander Braun.

The genus has cosmopolitan distribution.

Species:
 Tolypella antarctica (A. Braun) R. Corillion, 1982
 Tolypella apiculata A. Braun, 1882
 Tolypella boldii T. Sawa, 1973
 Tolypella californica A. Braun, 1882
 Tolypella canadensis T. Sawa, 1973
 Tolypella comosa T.F. Allen, 1883
 Tolypella fimbriata T.F. Allen, 1883
 Tolypella giennensis Reyes Prósper, 1910
 Tolypella glomerata (Desvaux) Leonhardi, 1863
 Tolypella hispanica C.F.O. Nordstedt ex T.F. Allen, 1888
 Tolypella intertexta T.F. Allen, 1883
 Tolypella intricata (Trentepohl ex Roth) H. von Leonhardi, 1863
 Tolypella longicoma A. Braun, 1882
 Tolypella nidifica (O.F. Müller) Leonhardi, 1864
 Tolypella normaniana C.F.O. Nordstedt, 1868
 Tolypella porteri (F.K. Daily) R.D. Wood, 1965
 Tolypella prolifera (Ziz ex A. Braun) Leonhardi, 1863
 Tolypella ramosa W.Q. Chen, G.X. Wang & F.S. Han, 1990
 Tolypella salina R. Corillion, 1960
 Tolypella stipitata S. Wang, 1965
 Tolypella xizangensis Y.Y. Lee, 1981
 Tolypella yunnanensis F.S. Han & W.Q. Chen, 1982

References

Charophyta
Charophyta genera